Hipster Whale is an Australian independent video game developer and publisher founded on 20 November 2014 by Andy Sum and Matt Hall, shortly before making the game Crossy Road. The company has also created the games Shooty Skies, Pac-Man 256 (in collaboration with Bandai Namco Entertainment), and Disney Crossy Road (in collaboration with Disney Interactive Studios).

History
After meeting at GCAP (Game Center: Asia Pacific) 2013, Andy Sum and Matt Hall decided to make Hipster Whale. The name came from discussing free-to-play games and the word "whale" came up in the conversation. Sum was doodling as they were talking and began drawing a whale, which would later become the company's logo. Sum and Hall kept the whale as the mascot for later on.

Hipster Whale's first game, Crossy Road was planned to take a total of six weeks to develop, but after seeing its potential, the developers spent more than 12 weeks on it. Crossy Road was inspired by linear movement games (modern successors to classic platform games)such as Temple Run and Flappy Bird. The name and concept of the game is based on the joke "Why did the chicken cross the road?".

On 22 May 2015, Bandai Namco Entertainment and Hipster Whale announced Pac-Man 256, which featured Pac-Man trying to escape ghosts and overcome a glitch while performing the same mechanics as the 1980 video game, with the glitch based on the Level 256 glitch from the original arcade game, but with upgrades and freemium purchases. On 20 August, the game was released, with the game then being released on Microsoft Windows, PlayStation 4 and Xbox One on 22 June 2016

In March 2016, Hipster Whale announced a spin-off of Crossy Road, Disney Crossy Road, which would be published by Disney Interactive Studios. On 20 July, the company announced its move into video game publishing, and appointed former Atari and Krome Studios Melbourne employee Clara Reeves as the president of Hipster Whale; she had recently worked at Film Victoria. On 7 September, the company released an update towards Disney Crossy Road, which added Monsters, Inc. characters to the game and a mode called the "Weekend Challenge".

Products

References

External links
 

Video game publishers
Video game companies of Australia
Indie video game developers
Video game development companies
Australian companies established in 2014
Video game companies established in 2014